Scythris paralogella is a moth of the family Scythrididae. It was described by Bengt Å. Bengtsson in 2002. It is found in mainland Yemen and on Socotra.

References

paralogella
Moths described in 2002